Triboro Coach Corporation was a bus company in New York City, United States, operating local service in Queens and express routes to Manhattan until February 20, 2006, when MTA Bus took over all of its bus operations and services.

History
Salvatore Fornatora began operating buses in Queens in April 1919 as the Woodside-Astoria Transportation Company, with his first route, the eastern part of today's Q19  route connecting the 103rd Street-Corona Plaza station on the recently opened Corona Line in Corona with Flushing. In 1928, the Corona terminal was extended westward, and moved to Astoria - 21st Street, completing the original formation of today's Q19 Astoria Boulevard bus route, when the Corona Line was extended to Flushing. The company was operating several other routes in the Astoria-Woodside-Maspeth area by 1930.

The new Triboro Coach Corporation was incorporated on April 10, 1931, running the Q18 and Q24 routes. On September 24, 1936, it acquired a city franchise for nine routes in northwestern Queens (the "Long Island City zone"). Triboro acquired the Q23 from the North Shore Bus Company, the Q29 from Kings Coach Company, the Q33 from Municipal Motor Bus Company, the Q38  from Affiliated Bus Transit Corporation, and the Q39 from National City Lines. After World War II during October 1947, Triboro was acquired by the stockholders of Green Bus Lines, after financial difficulties, but continued to operate independently. Its depot in East Elmhurst was opened on January 15, 1954. Major expansions were made in 1956 with an express bus route (now the Q53) between Woodside and Rockaway Park (replacing the Long Island Rail Road's Rockaway Beach Branch, out of service since 1950) and in 1961, when it acquired the Q72 (then the B72) from the New York City Transit Authority. Five express routes to Manhattan were initiated in the 1970s and 1980s: the QM10 & QM11 in 1970, QM12 in 1971, and QM22, QM24, and QM24W in June 1988. Triboro was the first private company in the city to initiate express operations with the Q53 Woodside-Rockaway Park Express bus line in 1956, at the request of the City of New York due to the loss of direct LIRR Rockaway service from Woodside.In addition to diesel powered buses, Triboro housed a Methanol, and compressed natural gas (CNG) fueling facility, along with several CNG powered buses at its final facility in East Elmhurst. The methanol fuel station was installed in 1989 for six General Motors-built methanol buses. In the early 1990s, three Triboro-operated RTS buses were fitted with special Detroit Diesel Series 92 engines that ran on methanol provided by Air Products & Chemicals. CNG fueling was installed in 1994 to be used for orders of TMC RTS-06 CNG buses and later Orion V CNG buses that were ordered in conjunction with identical buses used by Command Bus Company and Queens Surface Corporation (now Spring Creek Depot and College Point Depot respectively).

On February 20, 2006, the operations of Triboro Coach were taken over by the Metropolitan Transportation Authority (MTA) under the MTA Bus Company brand, the final part of the city's takeover of all the remaining subsidized privately operated bus routes. As part of the takeover, the former Triboro Coach garage became the LaGuardia Depot. However, the facility was severely damaged in April 2006 (only 2 months after the MTA Takeover) following an explosion within one of the natural gas lines and destroyed a former Triboro/ ex-Jamaica Bus RTS-04 (see below). All of the ex-Triboro CNG buses were transferred to Spring Creek and College Point Depots and ran from there up until their retirement.

Bus routes
Just prior to MTA Bus takeover, Triboro Coach operated the following routes. Most of these continue to be based out of the company's former facility in East Elmhurst.

Triboro also operated the Q57 express bus from Queensbridge at 21st Street and 41st Avenue to LaGuardia Airport in 1990. Nicknamed the "QT (Quick Trip) LaGuardia Express" bus route, it was discontinued in May 1991 due to lower than expected ridership. The service ran every 20 minutes, getting to the airport in 25 minutes, and stopping at all terminals. The route travelled via 21st Street and Astoria Boulevard to get to the airport. Service ran from 21st Street between 6 a.m. and 11 p.m. and from LaGuardia between 6:35 a.m. and 11 p.m.. The fare was $5, in addition to the $1.15 subway fare. The buses had luggage racks, air conditioning and padded seats.

Depots

Astoria depot
The company's first garage was located at 29-28 Vernon Boulevard or 23-29/29-23 Vernon Boulevard, at Vernon Boulevard and Main Avenue (Astoria Boulevard) in Astoria, Queens, on the eastern shore of the East River near the western terminal of the company's  route. The one-story brick building covered , and served as the company's main repair shops.

On July 19, 1926, an explosion and fire occurred in the garage's basement, leading to the death of a teenage employee. The facility was condemned by the city in the 1940s to construct the Astoria Houses public housing project, which remains there today.

Woodside depots
Triboro Coach simultaneously operated two garages in Woodside, Queens, in addition to its Astoria depot. The first was located at the southwest corner of Queens Boulevard and 51st Street, south of the 52nd Street subway station and adjacent to the New Calvary Cemetery. It was leased in 1939. The second was located at 69-01 35th Road or 65-10 35th Avenue, on a block bound by 65th Street to the west, 35th Avenue to the north, 69th Street to the east, and 35th Road to the south. It was located just north of the 65th Street subway station on Broadway. This  depot was leased in 1941. Both Woodside depots were condemned by the city in 1947. The second site at 65th Street was condemned for the construction of the Brooklyn–Queens Expressway (BQE). It closed in 1954, following eviction proceedings, replaced by the East Elmhurst location. The right-of-way of the BQE occupies the site today.

East Elmhurst depot

Triboro Coach's final depot was located on a two-block long structure (85-01 24th Avenue) bound by 85th and 87th Street, and 23rd and 24th Avenues in the East Elmhurst & Jackson Heights neighborhoods of Queens, New York near LaGuardia Airport. The depot was opened on January 15, 1954, at the cost of $1 million. The  garage housed 130 buses, with additional space outdoors. The depot became MTA Bus' LaGuardia Depot on February 20, 2006.

In 1989, a methanol fuel station was installed at the facility for six General Motors-built RTS methanol buses. It was later used in the early 1990s to fuel a New York City Transit Authority demonstration bus from the Casey Stengel Depot and three new Triboro-operated RTS buses fitted with special Detroit Diesel Series 92 engines. Beginning in 1994, the facility dispatched compressed natural gas (CNG) buses in addition to its diesel fleet. Under the MTA, the depot was decommissioned from CNG operations in 2006 due to not meeting the MTA's safety and environmental standards. On April 10, 2006, while workers from KeySpan were removing CNG from tanks and a private contractor was conducting construction near the depot, a gas compressor station exploded leading to a large fire at the depot. One bus was destroyed and 12 were damaged.

References
Triboro Coach Corporation (accessed January 19, 2007; Revived November 4, 2013)
NYCDOT - Privately Operated Bus Service (as of early-to-mid 2000s, accessed January 19, 2007)

External links
Triboro Coach Bus Photos (Bus:NYCSubway.org)
Triboro Coach Corporation (via the Internet Archive)
Triboro Coach Bus Routes
Triboro Coach and other Bus Routes

Bus transportation in New York City
Defunct public transport operators in the United States
American companies established in 1931
Transport companies established in 1931
1931 establishments in New York City
2006 disestablishments in New York (state)
American companies disestablished in 2006
Transport companies disestablished in 2006